The 1906 Galway Borough by-election was held on 3 November 1906.  The by-election was held due to the resignation of the incumbent Irish Parliamentary MP, Charles Ramsay Devlin, in order to return to Canada.  It was won by the Irish Parliamentary candidate Stephen Gwynn.

References

Politics of Galway (city)
Galway Borough by-election
By-elections to the Parliament of the United Kingdom in County Galway constituencies
Galway Borough by-election